Michigan's 23rd Senate district is one of 38 districts in the Michigan Senate. The 23rd district was created by the 1850 Michigan Constitution, as the 1835 constitution only permitted a maximum of eight senate districts. It has been represented by Republican Jim Runestad since 2023, succeeding Democrat Curtis Hertel Jr.

Geography
District 23 encompasses part of Oakland County.

2011 Apportionment Plan
District 23, as dictated by the 2011 Apportionment Plan, was based in Lansing and covered most of Ingham County, also included the surrounding communities of East Lansing, Mason, Haslett, Holt, Okemos, Edgemont Park, Meridian Township, and Delhi Township.

The district was located entirely within Michigan's 8th congressional district, and overlapped with the 67th, 68th, and 69th districts of the Michigan House of Representatives.

List of senators

Recent election results

2018

2014

Federal and statewide results in District 23

Historical district boundaries

Notes

References 

23
Ingham County, Michigan